Zaozerny is a rural locality (a settlement) in Selenginsky District, Republic of Buryatia, Russia. The population was 800 as of 2010.

References 

Rural localities in Selenginsky District